Aquinas College was a college in Milton, Massachusetts, and 15 Walnut Park, Newton, Massachusetts. It was closed in 2000. Its Newton campus was then used by The Rashi School, the Boston-area Reform Jewish K-8 Independent School. The school became vacant again when The Rashi School moved to their permanent home in nearby Dedham, Massachusetts, in 2010. In 2015, the city of Newton purchased the property to "house the preschool program and create additional school space to relieve overcrowding and facilities issues at several elementary schools".
Records are available at: Registrar's Office, Regis College, Box 15, 235 Wellesley Street, Weston, MA 02493.

References

External links
Article on Newton considering purchasing old site

Defunct private universities and colleges in Massachusetts
Defunct Catholic universities and colleges in the United States
Catholic universities and colleges in Massachusetts
Educational institutions disestablished in 2000